Clark Township is one of eleven townships in Montgomery County, Indiana, United States. As of the 2010 census, its population was 1,841 and it contained 812 housing units.

Clark Township was founded in 1830.

Geography

Cities, towns, villages
 Ladoga

Cemeteries
The township contains these six cemeteries: Harshbarger, Hicks, Inlow, Mount Pleasant, Stoner and Wesley.

Major highways
  U.S. Route 136

Lakes
 Morrison Lake

Education
 South Montgomery Community School Corporation

Clark Township residents are served by the Ladoga-Clark Township Public Library.

Political districts
 Indiana's 4th congressional district
 State House District 28
 State Senate District 23

References
 
 United States Census Bureau 2008 TIGER/Line Shapefiles
 IndianaMap

External links
 Indiana Township Association
 United Township Association of Indiana
 City-Data.com page for Clark Township

Townships in Montgomery County, Indiana
Townships in Indiana
1830 establishments in Indiana